The Men's 3 m springboard competition of the 2016 European Aquatics Championships was held on 12 May 2016.

Results
The preliminary round was held at 11:30. The final was held at 19:30.

Green denotes finalists

References

Diving